Greena is a small island off the west coast of Mainland, Shetland. It is 10m at its highest point, and is north of Flotta, Shetland. It is in Weisdale Voe.

References
 Venables, Ursula & Llewellyn, Tempestuous Eden, Museum Press, London 1952.

Uninhabited islands of Shetland